Travels is the debut studio album by American melodic hardcore band Defeater. The album was released on September 16, 2008, through Topshelf Records and re-released by Bridge 9 Records on February 24, 2009. It depicts the story of a young man born at the end of the Second World War to a struggling family living on the Jersey shores.

Track listing

Personnel
 Derek Archambault – vocals
 Jason Maas – guitars
 Max Barror – bass
 Andy Reitz – drums
 Gus Pesce – guitars

References 

2008 debut albums
Defeater (band) albums
Bridge 9 Records albums